The Angelina and Neches River Railroad  (Angelina & Neches River Railroad) is a short-line railroad headquartered in Lufkin, Texas.

ANR operates an  line from Dunagan, Texas, to an interchange with Union Pacific Railroad at Lufkin. With all owned tracks combined, the company owns and operates 28 miles of track plus 3.5 miles through trackage rights with Union Pacific. ANR traffic includes lumber, foundry products, paper, plywood, chemicals, limestone, scrap iron, steel, and clay.

It also operates short portions of lines formerly belonging to the East Texas Railroad and the Texas Southeastern Railroad as well as the original Cotton Belt line from Lufkin to the middle of Clawson, Texas.

References

External links

Link to Union Pacific Website with ANR Details
Angelina & Neches River Railroad

Texas railroads
Railway companies established in 1900
American companies established in 1900
1900 establishments in Texas